Arthrobacter rhombi is a Gram-positive, aerobic, non-spore-forming and non-motile bacterium species from the genus Arthrobacter which has been isolated from the halibut, Reinhardtius hippoglossoides.

References

Further reading

External links

Type strain of Arthrobacter rhombi at BacDive -  the Bacterial Diversity Metadatabase

Bacteria described in 1999
Micrococcaceae